Uvariopsis dicaprio is a critically endangered species of tropical evergreen tree in the genus Uvariopsis. It has only been found in the Ebo Forest in Cameroon on the Dicam trail 2000 meters away from Bekob camp. It was the first new plant species described in 2022, and was named after American actor Leonardo DiCaprio by botanists from the Royal Botanic Gardens, Kew.

Description 

Its trunk is smooth and tapering, reaching a diameter of "1.8–2.5 cm … at 1.5 m above the ground", with dark brown bark and occasional white horizontal lenticels.

Its leaves are oblanceolate, and are typically 17.7–20.3 cm long (but sometimes as long as 23 cm) and typically 7–7.9 cm wide (but sometimes only 6.4 cm wide). They are hairless, and coloured "pale yellow-green" but later turn "orangish brown". Their arrangement is distichous, and they are typically spaced 1.5–2.8 cm apart (but are sometimes as close as 1.2 cm or as far as 4.3 cm).

The specimen collected had only male flowers, but Gosline & Cheek et al. hypothesise that U. dicaprio is monoecious, with separate male and female flowers. Its male flowers are cauliflorous, growing directly from the stem, and glossy. Their pedicels, which connect the flower to the stem, are 1.8–2.5 cm long and about 1 mm in diameter. Each flower has two sepals and four petals.The sepals are 1–1.5 by 2.1–2.5 mm and hairless. The petals are typically about 16 by 9 mm (but sometimes as small as 14 by 5.5 mm), and 0.25–0.3 mm thick; they are thin and leathery but not fleshy, and are "yellow-green when live" but black when dried. There are typically 4–7 flowers in each inflorescence (but sometimes as few as 1). It has similar conical flower buds to Uvariopsis solheidii, which can vary from ovoid-conical to pyramidal.

Habitat and range 

U. dicaprio is endemic to the Ebo Forest, in the Littoral Region of Cameroon. It is found in the submontane forest, at elevations from 200 to 1,200 m.

References

External links 

 

Annonaceae
Plants described in 2022
Endemic flora of Cameroon
Taxa named by Martin Cheek